is a Japanese highway from Tokyo to Sendai that goes through the cities Mito, Iwaki and Sōma. It traces the old Mito Kaidō route from Tokyo to Mito, and, for much of its  route, it runs parallel to the Jōban railway line and the Jōban Expressway.

Route description
Originating in Chūō, Tokyo (at Nihonbashi, which also marks the origins of Routes 1, 4, 14, 15, 17 and 20), it ends in Miyagino-ku, Sendai (at the Nigatake interchange, junction with Route 45, also the origin of Route 47)

Major cities and villages it passes through include: Kashiwa, Toride, Tsuchiura, Ishioka, Mito, Hitachi, Iwaki, Tomioka, Ōkuma, Sōma, Watari, Iwanuma

The actual terminus is Iwanuma in Miyagi (at the Fujinami intersection) which is the junction of Routes 4 and 6. In the areas north of Iwanuma which overlap with the Route 4, signboards for Route 6 are not posted. This is equivalent to the distance from Mito to Kakegawa / Ichinoseki.

Overlapping sections
The following sections of Route 6 overlap with other routes:
In Chuo, Tokyo, from the origin point to Muromachi intersection: Route 17
In Chuo, Tokyo, from the origin point to Honchō 3-chōme intersection: Route 4
In Chuo, Tokyo, from the origin point to Asakusa-bashi intersection: Route 14
From Kashiwa, Chiba to Toride: Route 294
In Tsuchiura: Route 125 and Route 354
In Ishioka: Route 355

Effects of the Fukushima Daiichi nuclear disaster

One side of National Route 6 is known as the "nuclear dense zone". Tōkaimura (the first nuclear power plant of Japan), Ōkuma (center of the Fukushima Daiichi nuclear disaster) and Naraha (location of the Fukushima Daini Nuclear Power Plant) are located on adjacent of Route 6.

Due to the nuclear disaster, access is prohibited to a zone of  radius from the Fukushima Daiichi Nuclear Power Plant. National Route 6 was blocked for non-authorized traffic between Hirono (the Iwaki side) and Haranomachi (the Sōma side). The ban was lifted in September 2014 after the road decontamination, and vehicles (with exception of motorcycles and bicycles) are now allowed on the stretch of road.

History
National Route 6 is a part of the lengthened Tōkaidō which connects the Kansai region (Kinai), or Nara and Kyoto in particular, and the Pacific coast of Tōhoku (called the Tagajō). During the Ritsuryō period, roads from Kinai to the Tagajō were divided into two: the Tōkaidō eastern sea road (via Nagoya, Hamamatsu, Tokyo and Mito) and the Tōsandō eastern mountain road (via Gifu, Shiojiri, Takasaki and Utsunomiya). During the foundation of Kamakura Kanagawa, Ritsiryō Tōkaidō was divided into two roads: the westward Tōkaidō which connects southern Kantō (Kamakura, Edo, Tokyo) and Kyoto, and the northward Tōkaidō which connects southern Kantō and Pacific coasts of Tōhoku. Since the foundation of Edo, Tōkaidō was narrowed by the Tokugawa Shogunate, the westward Tōkaidō functioned as a seaside road to Kyoto and the northward Tōkaidō functioned as one to the Pacific coasts of Tōhoku.

On 4 December 1952 the Ritsuryō Tōkaidō north of Tokyo was designated First Class National Highway 6, while the other section was designated as National Route 1. On 1 April 1965 the route was re-designated as General National Highway 6. On 12 March 2011, access to a large section of National Route 6 was restricted due to the Fukushima Daiichi nuclear disaster between Hirono and Haranomachi.

List of major junctions

Route 16 in Kashiwa: Ōmiya, Saitama (west) and Chiba (southeast)
Route 125 in Tsuchiura: Koga, Ibaraki and Kumagaya (west) and Kashima, Ibaraki and Katori, Chiba (east)
Route 50 in Mito, Ibaraki: Utsunomiya, Oyama, Tochigi, and Takasaki
Route 51 in Mito: Kashima and Narita
Route 461 in Takahagi: Ōtawara, Nikkō, and Numata, Gunma
Route 289 in Nakoso (southern Iwaki): Shirakawa, Tajima, and Tadami, Fukushima
Route 49 in Iwaki, Fukushima: Kōriyama, Aizuwakamatsu, and Niigata
Route 288 in Ōkuma, Fukushima: Kōriyama, Aizuwakamatsu, and Niigata
Route 115 in Sōma, Fukushima: Fukushima (Nakadōri), Inawashiro, and Yonezawa, Murakami
Route 113 in Shinchi, Fukushima : Shiroishi, Miyagi, Nanyō, Yamagata, and Murakami

See also

References

External links

006
Roads in Chiba Prefecture
Roads in Ibaraki Prefecture
Roads in Fukushima Prefecture
Roads in Miyagi Prefecture
Roads in Tokyo